Danko Radić (30 October 1952 – 12 February 2018) was a Croatian professional basketball referee, executive and coach who served as the president of the Croatian Basketball Federation from 2004 to 2015.

Biography
Radić was born in the village of Podorljak based in Šibenik-Knin County. As a founder of the famous Croatian female basketball club, ŽKK Šibenik, he has worked many years as a women's basketball coach and later became a basketball referee. At first, he worked as a referee in the Yugoslav Second Basketball League, and later in the Yugoslav First Basketball League, FIBA World Cup, FIBA Eurobasket, Olympic Games, and the Mediterranean Games. 

In 2004 Radić was named the president of the Croatian Basketball Federation. On 21 June 2015, he was replaced by Croatian economist, politician and deputy prime minister in the second cabinet of prime minister Sanader, Ivan Šuker.

He died on 12 February 2018 in Zagreb, after a battle with long illness.

References

1952 births
2018 deaths
Croatian basketball coaches
Basketball referees
Basketball executives
ŽKK Šibenik coaches
Croatian sports executives and administrators
People from Šibenik-Knin County
Yugoslav basketball coaches